Sangaki (also Romanized as Sangakī; also known as Gūlokh Kalam, Kolūkh-e Kalam, and Kolūkh Kalam) is a village in Band-e Zarak Rural District, in the Central District of Minab County, Hormozgan Province, Iran. At the 2006 census, its population was 306, in 53 families.

References 

Populated places in Minab County